CRRC Shandong Co. Ltd., formerly also known as JRVEC (Jinan Railway Vehicles Equipment), is a railway rolling stock factory located in Jinan, Shandong, China, established in 1910 as a workshop of the Jinpu Railway.

CRRC Wind Power (formerly CNR Wind Power) is its wind power manufacturing subsidiary, established in 2010 in Songyuan.

History
The factory was established with German backing as a repair works for the northern parts of the Jinpu Railway; in 1914 it became the property of the 'Jinpu Railway Authority', under state control.

From 1951 the company was named , and after 1958 . The company operated mainly as a maintainer of steam locomotives. and also manufactured steam locomotives, including 117 YJ class and a small number of SY class.

In 1993 the company re-focused on manufacturing railway freight wagons, and was renamed . At the beginning of the 21st century began to diversified into other areas, including steel structure manufacture.

In July 2007 the company name was changed to Jinan Railway Vehicles Equipment Co., Ltd. (JRVEC), a wholly owned subsidiary of the China North Locomotive and Rolling Stock Industry (Group) Corporation (CNR Group). After the IPO of China CNR, the subsidiary belongs to the listed arm of the group.

In August 2016, the company name was changed to CRRC Shandong, after CNR Group was merged with CSR Group as CRRC Group.

Products
As of 2012 the company manufactured railway wagons, including tank, double-deck car transporting, open, flat, closed types, and wagon bogies. Other products included steel structures including communications towers, bridges, and wind turbine towers. The company also produced toilet systems and bolt tightening machines for specialised railway applications. The company had a production capacity of 7000 wagons per year.

Subsidiaries
CNR Wind Turbine Co., Ltd was established in Jinan with a capital of 100 million Yuan to design and manufacture wind turbines. CNR foresees a total investment of 3 billion Yuan to establish a facility with production capacity of 1000 wind turbines per year. On 4 September 2009 construction of a factory with a 500 turbine per year capacity began in Songyuan, Jilin province. The plant was fully complete by May 2011.

The company's first installed product was a 1.5MW turbine, used at the Shandong Dongying wind project from mid-2010, The first company's first 2MW turbine was manufactured in 2012.

References

External links
 

CRRC Group
Companies based in Jinan
Chinese brands